Cenemus is a genus of Seychelloise cellar spiders that was first described by Michael I. Saaristo in 2001.  it contains only three species, found only on the Seychelles: C. culiculus, C. mikehilli, and C. silhouette.

See also
 List of Pholcidae species

References

Araneomorphae genera
Pholcidae
Spiders of Africa